Grumman Studios is a sound stage complex in Bethpage, New York, United States, that offers 160,000 square feet with seven sound stages and 30 acres of paved outdoor space.

Principal owner in the project is Parviz Farahzad whose production company is Lunar Module Park, LLC.  The studios are in the former Apollo Lunar Module assembly plant at the massive Grumman aircraft works in Bethpage.  Farahzad founded the company in 2007.  The original blue Grumman landmark dome atop the facility has been repainted red for the new studio.

Grumman Studios is one of two large sound stage complexes in Bethpage related to the original Grumman operation.  The other is Gold Coast Studios which has  six sound stages totaling 105,000 square feet in Steel Equities Bethpage Business Park.

The studio is at 500 Grumman Road West in Bethpage.

Notable productions
 The Wiz Live! (broadcast live on NBC from the studios on December 3, 2015)
 Peter Pan Live! (broadcast live on NBC from the studios on December 4, 2014.)
 Annie filmed in 2013/2014 
 The Sound of Music Live! (broadcast live on NBC from the studios on December 5, 2013.)
 The Amazing Spider-Man 2 (also filmed at Gold Coast), 2012.
 The Avengers - 2012
 The Dictator (2011) - United Nations sequence was filmed there.
 Salt (2009)

References

External links
 grummanstudios.com

2007 establishments in New York (state)
Buildings and structures in Nassau County, New York
Companies based in Nassau County, New York
Bethpage, New York